Except the Dying is a 2004 made-for-TV film starring Peter Outerbridge, Colm Meaney, Keeley Hawes, William B. Davis and Flora Montgomery. It was adapted by Janet MacLean from the novel of the same name by Maureen Jennings.

Plot
In this film, William Murdoch is introduced as a man of strong principles who uses his unique abilities to solve crimes, sometimes using advanced science for his time.

On the street of Toronto in the 1890s, the naked body of a young chambermaid is found murdered in a back alley. Inspector Brackenreid decides that this is an accidental death, but Murdoch feels there's more to the situation at hand.

As Murdoch digs deeper into the death, he discovers that there is something more sinister going on and that the young girl was employed by a very rich and prominent family in Toronto.

Her autopsy, conducted by forensic scientist Dr. Julia Ogden working as coroner, reveals she was pregnant and had opium in her system, which makes Murdoch even more suspicious of her death. Murdoch solves the crime and brings justice for a young girl's wrongful death.

Cast
 Peter Outerbridge - Detective William Murdoch
 Colm Meaney - Inspector Brackenreid
 Keeley Hawes - Dr. Julia Ogden
 William B. Davis - Alderman Godfrey Shepcote
 Flora Montgomery - Ettie Weston

DVDs
One of three films that were released on DVDs in a boxed set on November 11, 2008.
On March 3, 2015, Acorn Media announced a re-release for all three movies, set for May 26, 2015.

References

External links 
 

Canadian drama television films
English-language Canadian films
2004 television films
2004 films
Films set in Toronto
Films based on Canadian novels
Films set in the 1890s
2000s Canadian films